Nai Roshni is a 1967 Bollywood film starring Ashok Kumar, Raaj Kumar, Biswajeet, Mala Sinha, Tanuja in lead roles.

It was also made in Tamil by the same producer, under the name Poovum Pottum and in Telugu as Punyavathi.

Plot 
The film is a social drama, with its plot around university professor Dr. Kumar (Ashok Kumar), who lives with his wife Padma (Bhanumathi), his drunkard son Jyoti (Raaj Kumar), outgoing daughter Chitra (Tanuja) and his friend's daughter Rekha (Mala Sinha). Dr. Kumar and his wife have a different outlook towards life, with him preferring books and philosophy, while his wife Padma prefers social gatherings and society clubs. Padma never considered Jyoti her son, who works as a mill designer, a profession she considers too poor to acknowledge. Chitra is encouraged by her mother to mingle freely in high society, much to the disappointment of her worried father.

Rekha prefers tending to her father at home, apart from studying. Prakash (Biswajeet), who lives with his blind mother (Sulochana) joins university as a lecturer, and takes lessons from Dr. Kumar to work on his PhD. Rekha and Prakash like each other. Meanwhile, Jyoti, who had taken to drinking to avoid loneliness of being neglected and insulted by his mother, is thrown out of the house by her. Chitra is attracted to Judge Kailashnath's son Ramesh, a philanderer, who promised to marry her, got her pregnant and then moved on to another girl.

Jyoti and Professor Kumar try to get Chitra and Ramesh married, to avoid humiliation for Chitra. But it is too late as Chitra consumes poison.

It is also revealed that Prakash's father, who had left his blind and pregnant mother, is none other than Professor Kumar. Prakash always hated his father for leaving his mother, and struggles to believe that the teacher he reveres led a deceitful life. How the problems are resolved forms the story.

Cast
Ashok Kumar as Professor Kumar
Raaj Kumar as Jyoti
Biswajeet as Prakash
Mala Sinha as Rekha
Tanuja as Chitra
P. Bhanumathi as Padma
Sulochana Latkar as Parvati
Asit Sen as Moti
Anwar Hussain as Ramzan
Sailesh Kumar as Ramesh
Pahari Sanyal as Judge Kailashnath
Chaman Puri as Principal
Pratima Devi as Prakash's Grandmother

Songs 
Soundtrack was composed by Ravi.

References

External links 
 Nai Roshni on YouTube
 

1967 films
1960s Hindi-language films
Indian drama films
Films directed by C. V. Sridhar
Hindi films remade in other languages
Films scored by Ravi
1967 drama films
Hindi-language drama films
Films based on works by Nihar Ranjan Gupta